Peter John Wilby (born 7 November 1944) is a British journalist. He is a former editor of The Independent on Sunday and the New Statesman.

Early life and career
Wilby was educated at Kibworth Beauchamp grammar school in Leicestershire before gaining a place at Sussex University. While at Sussex, from where he graduated with a degree in history, he helped found a short-lived university paper called Sussex Outlook.

In 1968, he began his career as a reporter on The Observer, becoming Education Correspondent four years later. In the same role, he worked for the New Statesman (1975–77), and for The Sunday Times (1977–86).

Wilby joined The Independent on Sunday in 1990 and eventually became its editor (1995–96).

New Statesman editor
Wilby was the editor of the New Statesman from 1998 to 2005.

In February 2002, Wilby apologised and took personal responsibility for running the cover of the 14 January 2002 issue. It featured the headline, "A Kosher Conspiracy" promoting articles by Dennis Sewell and John Pilger respectively concerning the alleged Zionist lobby in Britain and Tony Blair's appointment of Michael Levy as his special envoy in the Middle East. The NS cover was denounced by David Triesman, then general secretary of the Labour Party, as being antisemitic. Wilby, in his apology, wrote that the cover was "not intended to be anti-Semitic".

"I don't accept that there's such a thing as New Labour", Wilby told David Lister of The Independent in July 2002. He described the term as being "an invention of the marketing people close to the Labour leader". A scoop Wilby was fond of at the time concerned an interview with the Physician, Professor and Labour peer Robert Winston, whose comparison of the National Health Service (NHS) with health provision in Poland, Wilby said had changed government policy.

Julia Langdon wrote in the British Journalism Review around the same time that the NS under Wilby had a reputation in the "political trade" for "being either dull, or silly". With Wilby as editor, it had become "ever more critical of the Government, notably with the anti-American line he took after September 11". A New Statesman article in autumn 2004 by Robert Service, then Professor of Russian History at Oxford University, and in particular the cover illustration, portrayed Tony Blair as the modern equivalent of Joseph Stalin.

Wilby's deputy, Cristina Odone, resigned in early November 2004 for unconnected reasons, although she did object to the cover. Odone and Wilby praised each other in the media and denied having had a row, although claims of such professional disagreements were made in the press quoting Odone herself. Wilby, she said, was "the old-fashioned socialist who" remained "true to his ideals".

Wilby himself was dismissed from the post of editor in 2005 by then owner Geoffrey Robinson. As a result of the magazine being unsympathetic to New Labour, Cristina Odone wrote in The Observer that she believed Wilby was pushed out of his post in preparation for Gordon Brown becoming prime minister. Wilby was the longest serving editor of the New Statesman since Kingsley Martin, who had retired from the post in 1960.

While circulation was much the same when he assumed the role as when he relinquished it in 2005, Wilby wrote in an article for the British Journalism Review that he managed to turn "a substantial financial loss into a healthy operating profit".

Later career
Wilby continues to write a weekly "First Thoughts" column for the New Statesman. He also writes for The Observer and The Guardian. Wilby claims to live "quietly and unfashionably" in Loughton. He identifies as a feminist and a republican.

References

External links

First Thoughts column
Other New Statesman contributions by Peter Wilby

1944 births
Living people
British male journalists
British atheists
British socialists
British feminists
British republicans
Male feminists
British socialist feminists
People from Kibworth
The Guardian journalists
The Independent people
The Sunday Times people
New Statesman people
The Independent on Sunday editors
People from Loughton